Franck Passi (born 28 March 1966) is a French retired footballer who played as a midfielder. He is the assistant manager of Ligue 1 club Lyon.

Coaching career
Passi worked in a player recruitment role for one of his old clubs, Olympique Marseille, between 2007 and 2010 before becoming Reserve Team Coach at the club in May 2010. In 2012, he was promoted again, this time as assistant coach to Elie Baup. After the departure of Baup in December 2013, Passi continued his duties as assistant coach under José Anigo, as well as under Argentine coach Marcelo Bielsa.

In August 2015, after Bielsa left following defeat in the opening game of the season, Passi was appointed caretaker boss. In the one game of his tenure, his Ligue 1 debut away to Reims, the team lost 1–0. 

On 19 April 2016, Bielsa's successor Míchel was sacked on the day before the Coupe de France semi-final against Sochaux, and Passi took temporary charge for the second time in the season. He won the game 1–0 through Florian Thauvin's goal. In the 2016 Coupe de France Final, the team lost 4–2 to Le Classique rivals Paris Saint-Germain. Passi saved Marseille from relegation and led the club for exactly six months until October 2016, when Rudi Garcia was hired as Míchel's replacement following the club's takeover by Frank McCourt.

In February 2017, Passi was named caretaker boss of fourth-from-bottom Lille, to pave the way for Bielsa's arrival in the summer. On 24 January 2019, Passi was named caretaker coach of Monaco, following the suspension of Thierry Henry. He oversaw the team for just one match, a 2–0 defeat to Dijon, before Leonardo Jardim was installed as permanent coach.

In January 2020, Passi was appointed as manager of Ligue 2 club Chamois Niortais until the end of the season following the departure of Pascal Plancque. He left at the end of the season, saying that he was preparing to be an assistant at Laurent Blanc's new project. In December 2020, he became Blanc's assistant manager at Al-Rayyan SC.

Personal life
Passi comes from a family of footballers. His father, Camille Passi, was a Congolese footballer, and coach in his later career. His son, Bryan Passi, is a professional footballer who also played for Montpellier. His brother, Gérald Passi, was also a professional footballer who played for the France national football team.

Managerial statistics

References

External links

1966 births
Living people
People from Bergerac, Dordogne
Association football midfielders
French footballers
France under-21 international footballers
French sportspeople of Republic of the Congo descent
Montpellier HSC players
Olympique de Marseille players
Toulouse FC players
SC Toulon players
AS Monaco FC players
SD Compostela footballers
Bolton Wanderers F.C. players
Ligue 1 players
Ligue 2 players
La Liga players
Segunda División players
English Football League players
French expatriate footballers
Expatriate footballers in Spain
Expatriate footballers in England
French football managers
Olympique de Marseille managers
Chamois Niortais F.C. managers
Ligue 1 managers
Ligue 2 managers
Sportspeople from Dordogne
Footballers from Nouvelle-Aquitaine
French expatriate sportspeople in Spain
French expatriate sportspeople in Qatar
French expatriate sportspeople in England